Carson Ferri-Grant (born December 17, 1950) is an American actor and artist. Grant has created characters and stories in visual mediums as drawings, paintings, in films and on stage.

Career
Grant moved to New York City in 1970 to study acting technique with Lee Strasberg. He joined the professional acting unions: Screen Actors Guild, American Federation of Television and Radio Artists and Actors' Equity Association; and was represented by the William Morris Agency, who created the stage name 'Carson Grant'. He trained with Wally Harper, who coached his baritone voice, and Phil Black who trained him with modern jazz and fencing.

Grant performed various acting roles with New York City Opera and began his film acting career in films as Man on a Swing, The Front and Death Wish. He portrayed 'Romeo' in Romeo and Juliet at New Jersey Shakespeare in the Park and was young 'Thomas Jefferson' in The Last Ballot in the WNET 13 Bicentennial series.

Grant painted large oil canvases and constructed many art installations in alternative exhibition spaces as part of the East Village, Manhattan 1970s Art Movement, participating in Colab, Charas/El Bohio, ABC No Rio, Fashion Moda; and many group art shows in the East Village, the Westside, and the Bronx in alternative spaces. Leo Castelli recognized Grant's installation of living sand sculptures 'Coney Island Bathing Beauties' shown in "The Coney Island Art Show 1981," and his triptych 'In Life Turmoil' in the "Time Square Show" 1980 organized by Collaborative Project Inc. Colab. Grant had a cobalt blue 'graffiti tag' of a pine tree coastline with his initials CFG, and on a midnight graffiti session, he had painted ten foot high cobalt blue iris flowers stretching the block-long 100 foot wall on the Lower East Side Con Edison plant, at Avenue C and 14th Street, titled "Open your Irises", in protest of the pollution produced by the energy plant. Influenced by Robert Rauschenberg's use of art for social change, Grant's one-man exhibition was called "Nature-Nuclear" at the 1979 Jack Morris Gallery, NYC, where he constructed a large climb-up-into 'scarred Mother Earth Uterus' post-nuclear, with her distorted next-generation traveling down her maimed fallopian tubes into her contaminated womb (30' x 40'). The work, encouraged the viewer to consider alternative energy sources to protect our environment.

During this decade, he helped establish the 'Westside Arts Coalition' with a group of multi-discipline Upper West Side artists at Symphony Space to help establish exhibition spaces and affordable arts studios. In 1981, as the WSAC group marched to Lincoln Center to protest President Ronald Reagan's budget cuts to the Arts, Grant's photographs appeared on the front page of the Westsider Newspaper,. In 1981, he organized a 'not-for-profit' art group called 'EAU' Environmental Artists United which created educational art exhibitions merging art and environmental conservation, which received grants from America the Beautiful Fund and Avon Foundation. Grant exhibited his artwork in alternative spaces throughout the boroughs, as one of the artists in the New York City 1970's and 1980's Art Movement.

Graduating as a Psi Chi Honors Society recipient in Psychology and elected Psi Chi president at CUNY - Hunter College BA program, Grant's master thesis on the Therapeutic Validity of Drama/Art Therapy, earned him an MA (summa cum laude) at University of Connecticut. He pursued postgraduate work at Columbia University. Grant presented his research at Georgetown's Drama Therapy Association 1985 convention.

Art installations and digital media
Grant attended and taught at Pratt School of Art and Design, New York City to enhance his knowledge of computer graphics and digital editing. He worked as a computer graphic artist, animator and editor using AT&T- NASA software, creating formats for the premiere of CD-ROM and DVD and Internet technology, for companies such as Fusion, Advanced Graphics, Exhibit Technologies, Carabineer, and Ogilvy & Mather Advertising.

Painting on the computer tablet, Carson created animations for the 1991 Sony's Time Square Video Screen, present-day Panasonic panel hung on the One Times Square building, for the Ayer advertising campaign "Breakthrough with the Unexpected" animation of an egg cracking to release a butterfly  and also projects for IBM, Intel, Kodak, DeBeers, Shell, American Express, and National Geographic's Global Access Interactive Gallery in Washington, DC.

For the SIGGRAPH - 1990 Convention, Texas, to honor John F. Kennedy's memory, Grant constructed the suspended 3D hologram sculpture (100' x 100') titled Harmony Mountain inside the second floor of the old Dallas Union Train Station, where a viewer could walk around and under the mountainous shape. In the artist's words, "The installation's purpose was to harness viewers' peaceful thoughts and funnel them through the five pointed Texas Star Vortex (20' diameter) which was hung between the two massive exterior columns on the balcony over looking the historically tarnished Dallas Dealey Plaza and Texas School Book Depository. Grant was honored with the SIGGRAPH Vision in Art Award.

Grant participated as a visual artist in many group art exhibitions in New York City as a curator, a contributing painter and photographer. As a film actor, Grant has portrayed more than 400 film characters in commercial and independent films as of 2012.

In 2010, Carson Ferri-Grant painted a 32 ft x 14 ft mural of a Buzzard Bay estuary, on the third floor exterior of the old Ocean Spray Cranberry Factory in East Wareham, Cape Cod, Massachusetts, which helped draw the artistic community to this location, as the Buzzard Bay Theater Company and 3065 Music Club.
 
In 2011, Carson Ferri-Grant curated an exhibition "Fall: Rising Above 9-11" for the West Side Arts Coalition, New York City. He asked the contributing artists to create original art work of their feelings about 9-11 for the tenth anniversary.
,

In 2015 Grant was honored to model for Bernando Siciliano's painting of Jesus being taken down from the cross, exhibited at the Alcon Gallery, NYC.

In 2017 Grant was the `Yogi Namaste´in Emblem Health 2017 Campaign.

Returning to acting

In 1998, Italian director Edoardo Amati asked Grant to portray his lead character in the film Master Shot.

In 2008, Carson Ferri-Grant was elected Vice President of GIAA (Guild of Italian American Actors) and represented GIAA delegate on the 4 A's (Associated Actors and Artistes of America) meetings chaired by President Theodore Bikel.

In 2015, Grant, Vice President of GIAA (Guild of Italian American Actors), was elected as the Vice President of the Associated Actors and Artiste of America and Artistes of America into the Department for Professional Employees, DPE, AFL-CIO. Grant as VP for GIAA, speaks at the AFL-CIO`S DPE-AEMI: Arts Entertainment Media Industry conference 2021-Union Leaders to Discuss Their Legislative Diversity Agenda.

In 2017 Grant for his role as `Professor John Allen´ in the film One Penny won Best Actor in the Film Forum at the Philadelphia Independent Film Festival.

As a film actor, Grant has portrayed more than 400 film characters in commercial and independent films as of 2020. In 2013 performed at Symphony Space, NYC in 50 year tribute to JFK in gala event "November 21, 1963: The day before".

Awards and memberships
Grant has won a number of artistic and civic awards, including the Rhode Island Scholastic Gold Key Art Award (1962), Avon Foundation grant 1981, America The Beautiful Fund grant (1981), ACM SIGGRAPH: Vision in Art Award (1990), and the GIAA Italian American Heritage Award (2007). The latter was awarded for contributing to the positive portrayal of Italian American culture via his role in the film God Bless America.

In 2008, Carson Ferri-Grant, was honored with a membership into the National Society of the Sons of the American Revolution through the Rhode Island Chapter. In 2009 Carson Ferri-Grant was included in the Marquis "Who's Who in American Art", and "Who's Who in America", and in 2010 was honored for inclusion in Marquis "International Who's Who".

References

External links

American male film actors
American male television actors
Lee Strasberg Theatre and Film Institute alumni
Male actors from New York (state)
Male actors from Rhode Island
Sons of the American Revolution
Artists from Rhode Island
Artists from New York (state)
1950 births
Living people